Stykkishólmur Airport  is an airport serving Stykkishólmur, Iceland.

See also
List of airports in Iceland
Transport in Iceland

References

External links
 OurAirports - Iceland
 Stykkishólmur Airport
 Google Earth

Airports in Iceland